Eastern Samar's at-large congressional district is the sole congressional district of the Philippines in the province of Eastern Samar. Also known as Eastern Samar's lone district, it has been represented in the House of Representatives of the Philippines since 1965. It first elected a representative provincewide at-large for the 6th Congress of the Third Philippine Republic following its creation and that of Northern Samar as regular provinces separate from Samar under Republic Act No. 4221 on June 19, 1965. It has remained a single-member district for the House of Representatives as well as the Fourth Philippine Republic parliament known as the Regular Batasang Pambansa from 1984 to 1986.

The district is currently represented in the 18th Congress by Maria Fe R. Abunda of the PDP–Laban.

Representation history

Election results

2022

2019

2016

2013

2010

See also
Legislative district of Eastern Samar

References

Congressional districts of the Philippines
Politics of Eastern Samar
1965 establishments in the Philippines
At-large congressional districts of the Philippines
Congressional districts of Eastern Visayas
Constituencies established in 1965